Gocha Sergeyevich Mikadze (born 7 September 1965 in Tskhaltubo, died 7 August 2017) was a Georgian professional football coach and a former player. His professional debut was in 1986 in Soviet High League. Last, he worked as an assistant coach at FC SKA Rostov-on-Don. He also held Russian citizenship.

References

External links
 

1965 births
2017 deaths
Soviet footballers
Footballers from Georgia (country)
FC SKA Rostov-on-Don players
Football managers from Georgia (country)
Association football goalkeepers
FC Spartak-UGP Anapa players